Aji River may refer to:

Aji River (Gujarat), India
Aji Chay, a river in East Azerbaijan Province, Iran
Aji River (Osaka), Japan, adjacent to the Nishi-Osaka Route